Jens Gad is a German producer, songwriter and guitarist of Danish parents. He started making music at a young age.

Gad produces music for many artists (Sandra Cretu / Sandra Gambino) and was previously co-producer for the musical project, Enigma. In the past he has released albums under the name of "Enigmatic Obsession", "Jens Gad Presents" for his new instrumental work, and also under the name of "Achillea", for his new world-influenced music which features different female vocalists on each album, singing in different languages.

Gad works from his 007 music studio in the city of Avalon on Catalina Island, off the coast of Los Angeles. Jens is the older brother of Toby Gad.

In 2019, Gad was featured in the Visual Collaborative Polaris catalogue for the creative sector, he was interviewed alongside people such as; Remi Vaughan-Richards, Bahia Shehab and Yvonne Sangudi.

In 2019 Jens worked with Sandra Gambino on her debut album "Shades of Love".

Projects
Jens Gad's own musical project, Achillea, has released two albums: The Nine Worlds (2005) in collaboration with singer Helene Horlyck and Amadas Estrellas (2007) in collaboration with Spanish singer Luisa Fernandez.

Discography

Albums
 1986: Contact – Fancy
 1988: All or Nothing – Milli Vanilli
 1989: NRG. – Q
 1989: Love Is No Science – Münchener Freiheit
 1991: Welcome to the Soul Asylum – Angel X
 1993: The Cross of Changes – Enigma
 1993: Sliver: Music from the Motion Picture – Enigma / BSO
 1995: Will I Be Faithful? – Slavik...Kemmler
 1995: Fading Shades – Sandra
 1998: The Energy of Sound – Trance Atlantic Air Waves
 1999: Snowin' Under My Skin – Andru Donalds
 1999: My Favourites – Sandra
 2000: The Screen Behind the Mirror – Enigma
 2000: Freiheit Die Ich Meine – Münchener Freiheit
 2001: Let's Talk About It – Andru Donalds
 2001: Love Sensuality Devotion: The Greatest Hits – Enigma
 2001: Love Sensuality Devotion: The Remix Collection – Enigma
 2002: The Wheel of Time – Sandra
 2003: Zeitmaschine – Münchener Freiheit
 2003: Voyageur – Enigma
 2005: Secrets of Seduction – released under the group name Enigmatic Obsession
 2005: The Nine Worlds – released under the group name Achillea
 2006: Le Spa Sonique – released under the recording artist name  Jens Gad Presents
 2007: Amadas Estrellas – released under the group name  Achillea
 2007: The Art of Love – Sandra
 2009: Back to Life – Sandra
 2021: ''Shades of Love – Sandra Gambino

References

External links
 JensGad.com 
  Jens Gad en EnigmaMusica.com
 (Russian) Q NRG.

German electronic musicians
German guitarists
German male guitarists
German people of Danish descent
Living people
Musicians from Munich
Enigma (German band) members
1966 births
German emigrants to the United States